Overall, 45 players have represented the Dutch national women's cricket team in Twenty20 International (T20I) cricket. The Netherlands made its Twenty20 International debut in July 2008, when the team played two T20Is against the West Indies in Utrecht. However, at the 2011 World Cup Qualifier, the Netherlands failed to make the top six teams, thus losing both its ODI and T20I status. Between 2008 and 2011, the Netherlands played in a total of eleven T20I fixtures, including three matches at the 2010 ICC Women's Challenge. In April 2018, the International Cricket Council (ICC) granted full international status to Twenty20 women's matches played between member sides from 1 July 2018 onwards. This list includes all players who have played at least one T20I match and is initially arranged in the order of debut appearance. Where more than one player won their first cap in the same match, those players are initially listed alphabetically at the time of debut.

Key

List of players
Statistics are correct as of 3 December 2022.

See also
 List of Netherlands women Test cricketers
 List of Netherlands women ODI cricketers

References

Netherlands
   
Twenty20